Big Brother Canada 8 is the eighth season of the Canadian reality television series Big Brother Canada. It is based on the Dutch series of the same name, which gained notoriety in 1999 and 2000. Arisa Cox returned as the host for the series. The season premiered with a two-night premiere on March 4–5, 2020, on Global and was expected to end on May 21 with the live finale. Preceding the two-night premiere, on March 1, there was a one hour long event, titled Big Brother Canadas Supersized Season 8 Preview with ET Canada, which featured interviews with the entire cast, an exclusive tour of the house with Arisa Cox, a retrospective on the past seven seasons, and the official reveal of the season's supersized theme.

The season was planned to run for a total of 83 days. However, on March 24, 2020, Big Brother Canada announced an early end to production on the season due to the COVID-19 pandemic in Canada, with the season finale airing on April 1, 2020. All filming ceased on March 24. The  prize that would have gone to the winner went to a COVID-19 relief charity.

HouseGuests 

The HouseGuests' images and profiles were released on Wednesday, February 26, 2020.

Future appearances
Jamar Lee and Minh-Ly Nguyen-Cao appeared on the fifth season of Ex on the Beach.

Production

Development 
On May 30, 2019, Big Brother Canada was renewed for an eighth season. Nine months later, on January 20, 2020, Global announced the two-night premiere on March 4–5, 2020. With the premiere date, they announced the "supersized" theme, but nothing about what that entails. Arisa Cox returned as the season's host.

On March 4, or Day 5 inside the house, Nico Vera decided to leave the game. This was the second time HouseGuest quit Big Brother Canada and the first time for non-personal reasons, after Ramsey Aburaneh left on season 4 due to a family emergency.

Then, on March 16, or Day 17 in the house, Jamar Lee was expelled from the house after he broke a house rule by threatening fellow HouseGuest Kyle Rozendal. On March 18, or Day 19, Rozendal was also expelled from the house. These instances were the first and second expulsions in Big Brother Canada history.

Impact of the COVID-19 pandemic 

On March 12, 2020, or Day 13 in the house, Big Brother Canada suspended all live audiences for their shows due to the COVID-19 pandemic. On March 15, or Day 16 inside the house, all of the current HouseGuests were notified of the current events outside of the house, including the pandemic. They were informed that all of their families were healthy. Also that day, production suspended the Have-Not cycle for the week to relieve stress, particularly for the Have-Nots. The HouseGuests were all assessed by a doctor to see if any of them showed signs of the virus; none of them had any symptoms related to the virus. That same day, Global and Insight Productions stated that they plan to continue with the production of the eighth season. On March 22, some of the sixty Big Brother Canada crew members resigned due to concerns about working during the pandemic.

On March 23, 2020 at 4:47 p.m. EDT, in Ontario where the show is filmed, Premier Doug Ford ordered the mandatory 14-day closure of all non-essential workplaces by March 24 at 11:59 p.m. As a result, Global and Insight Productions announced that production for the season had ended on March 24, moving the finale up from May 21 and having it air on April 1, 2020; they had no plans to resume production at a later time. The  prize that would have gone to the winner went to a COVID-19 relief charity.

It became the third season of Big Brother worldwide to ever be discontinued, the other two being the Arab world's Big Brother: The Boss, after the show caused controversy regarding religious issues, and Serbia's second season of Veliki Brat, after three HouseGuests evicted earlier in the season were killed in a car accident. The fourth season of Big Brother to be discontinued was the second season of the Malayalam version of Bigg Boss in India, which was discontinued for the same reason.

Casting 
Kasting Inc. returned to cast the eighth season. On August 15, 2019, casting opened online, with open casting calls beginning on October 12, 2019. Open casting calls were held in Vancouver, Calgary, Halifax, Winnipeg, Moncton, Saskatoon, Victoria, Edmonton, Montreal, St. John's, Kelowna, and Toronto. The ability to apply online closed on November 15, 2019. The HouseGuests were announced on February 26, 2020.

Filming 
Filming started on February 29, 2020, with a live audience for the premiere episode. A live audience was featured during the two-night premiere. However, on March 12 during the fifth episode, Arisa Cox announced that there will no longer be a live audience over concerns of having large gatherings during the COVID-19 pandemic. Filming took place at Studio 550 in Toronto, Ontario.

Filming came to a halt on March 24 after production ended the season due to the pandemic. The finale was scheduled for May 21. Instead, a special farewell special aired on April 1.

House design 
On February 24, 2020, Global released eight images from the house, including the Head of Household room, kitchen, diary room, and backyard. With this drop, the theme for the season was confirmed to be comic books and superheroes. During the Big Brother Canadas Supersized Season 8 Preview with ET Canada special on March 1, Arisa Cox gave the viewers a full house tour. The house features an Expedia departure lounge, a swamp-styled Have-Not room, and a Fortress of Solitude style Head of Household ensuite.

Release 
On January 20, 2020, a press release from Global announced that a never before seen special will air on March 1, 2020, three days before the two-night premiere starting on March 4. Big Brother Canadas Supersized Season 8 Preview with ET Canada will feature interviews with the entire cast, an exclusive tour of the house with Arisa Cox, a retrospective on the past seven seasons, and the official reveal of the season's supersized theme. The free 24/7 live feeds, hosted on Big Brother Canadas website, started on March 5 at 9:00 p.m. EST (6:00 p.m. PST) after the first eviction episode and ended on March 23 abruptly at around 4 p.m. EDT (1:00 p.m. PDT). On March 24, 2020, Global announced that they would be moving the finale broadcast date up from May 21 to April 1 due to the COVID-19 pandemic causing the season to end earlier.

Episodes

Notes

Have-Nots

Notes

Nomination shortlist

Voting history

Notes 

 :   When the cast was revealed, voting opened for Canada to save a HouseGuest of their choice. The four people who received the fewest votes, Chris, Minh-Ly, Nico, and Susanne, would compete in two competitions. The winners of each competition would be saved. Minh-Ly won the first competition and Chris won the second, leaving Nico and Susanne nominated for the first eviction.
 : On Day 5, Nico walked from the game, cancelling the eviction vote set for Day 6.
 :  During Week 3, The Power of Veto Competition was played in pairs. The original player picked had to choose a player to play with them during the competition. If that pair won, then the original player picked would win the Power of Veto and their teammate would receive immunity. Madeline won the Power of Veto, and her partner, John Luke, earned immunity for the rest of the week.
 : On Day 17, Jamar was expelled from the game after allegedly exhibiting "threatening" behaviour toward Kyle. On Day 19, Kyle was expelled from the game for problematic behaviour. As a result of both expulsions, no eviction vote was held for Week 3. The game reset for Week 4, allowing Sheldon (outgoing Head of Household) to compete in Week 4's Head of Household competition, which he ultimately won.
 : The HouseGuests were told that the winner of Week 4's Head of Household competition would win a special power. Sheldon won the competition and was secretly awarded the Wendy's Power Up Necklace - which awarded the holder the ability "Spice up the Veto" (allowing the HoH to play in the PoV) or to "Chop A Vote" (voiding an eviction vote from a HouseGuest at the next eviction). Sheldon chose to "Chop A Vote".
 : On Day 25, Big Brother Canada announced an early end to production on the season due to the COVID-19 pandemic. Big Brother Canada 8 ended with no winner.

Reception

Viewing figures

References

External links 
Global official site

2020 Canadian television seasons
Big Brother Canada seasons
Television productions cancelled due to the COVID-19 pandemic